Daniela Vallega-Neu (born 1966) is a German philosopher and Professor of Philosophy at the University of Oregon. She is known for her expertise on hermeneutics, deconstruction and Heidegger's thought.

Books
 Heidegger’s Poietic Writings: From Contributions to Philosophy to The Event, Indiana University Press, 2018
 The Bodily Dimension in Thinking, SUNY Press, 2005
 Heidegger’s ‘Contributions to Philosophy.’ An Introduction,  Indiana University Press, 2003
 Die Notwendigkeit der Gründung im Zeitalter der Dekonstruktion: Zur Gründung in Heideggers 'Beiträgen zur Philosophie'; unter Hinzuziehung der Derridaschen Dekonstruktion, Duncker & Humblot, 1997

See also
 Contributions to Philosophy

References

External links
Daniela Vallega-Neu at the University of Oregon

German philosophers
Philosophy academics
University of Oregon faculty
Heidegger scholars
Hermeneutists
Living people
1966 births
Gadamer scholars
Derrida scholars
California State University faculty
University of Freiburg alumni
Pennsylvania State University faculty
German–English translators